Cheng Peng may refer to:
 Peng Cheng, Chinese pair skater
 Cheng Peng (serial killer), Chinese serial killer